NHL 2016 may refer to:
2015–16 NHL season
2016–17 NHL season
NHL 16, video game
2016 National Hurling League